Ahmed Attoumani Douchina (born January 2, 1955) is a Mahoran politician. Douchina served as the President of the Departmental Council of Mayotte between 20 March 2009 and 3 April 2011, when he was succeeded by Daniel Zaïdani. Zaudani narrowly defeated Douchina 10-9 (by just one vote) in the council's presidential election.

References 

1955 births
Presidents of the General Council of Mayotte
Members of the Departmental Council of Mayotte
Mayotte politicians
Living people
Union of Democrats and Independents politicians
People from Mayotte